After All These Years is the first studio album from Brian & Jenn Johnson, and their fourth album overall. The album was released on January 27, 2017, by Bethel Music. The duo worked with Jason Ingram and Paul Mabury in the production of the album.

Background 
Brian and Jenn Johnson, after a hiatus of more than ten years as a duo, announced on January 13, 2017 that their album would be released on January 27, 2017. The Johnsons, having been worship pastors and songwriters at Bethel Church for over fifteen years, in addition to composing and recording songs for Bethel Music, also released Undone in 2001 and We Believe in 2006. The musical style of the album is different from previous Bethel Music releases in that an 80-piece symphony orchestra is featured on all tracks of the album.

Brian Johnson had an interview with Sharefaith Magazine about the album and his worship ministry. He shared his personal story about overcoming a nervous breakdown through devotion to studying scripture and worship, telling that a demo of the song "Greater Than All Other Names" by Jason Ingram helped him, saying: "I listened to that song on repeat every day for six months straight, it really ministered to me." In the duo's interview with Doug Doppler of Worship Musician magazine, he went on to say about "Greater Than All Other Names" that for the rest of his life "there probably won’t be a song in my iTunes music library that will have as many plays as that one." In the same interview, Jenn Johnson was asked about the story behind "Mention of Your Name", to which she responded that she "said the name of Jesus as they were rushing me into an emergency C-section because it was the only thing I had to say" and that it offered her peace.

Promotion 

Three songs were made available for download during pre-order on January 6, 2017 with the album being released on January 27, 2017. The songs which were released are "Mention of Your Name", "Only Jesus" and "Gravity".

Singles 
"You're Gonna Be OK", the song led by Jenn Johnson was released on May 8, 2017, as the lead single from the album. "You're Gonna Be OK" impacted Christian radio on May 26, 2017.

Critical reception 

Designating the album four stars at CCM Magazine, Matt Conner states, "After spending the bulk of their book time raising up exciting new worship leaders and inspirational voices, the time has come for another release from the duo. After All These Years is the resulting release, filled with dynamic vertical songs that connect the heart of the listener with the heart of God. ... The album is another way in which the Johnsons continue to nurture the church." Madeleine Dittmer, affixing a four and a half star rating upon the album for The Christian Beat, concludes that the album, "is both musically and lyrically a beautiful collection of worship songs. The Johnson's love and adoration for Good shines through with prayerful lyrics, and the instrumentation and melodies join with these inspired words to crazy some that are beautiful offerings of worship." Bestowing a nine square rating for Cross Rhythms, Tony Cummings concludes simply: "Another gem from the Bethel Music movement." Timothy Yap of Hallels rated the album five stars, saying that "if you love slow and pensive ballads sung with utmost verve, After All These Years is it." In his track-by-track four star review of the album at Jesus Freak Hideout, Matthew Baldwin concluded that "The Johnsons do not disappoint in their latest offering as the years of leading and writing worship music lend a polish and depth that only years and experience can bring. The neoclassical arrangements give the music an artsy enough experience to impress the hipster culture as well as the casual music connoisseur. It is a worshipful experience that is well worth the journey and has me excited about the worship music scene." The album garnered a four and a half star rating from a NewReleaseToday review by Kevin Davis stating that it, "is best described as a worship experience with an ethereal tone," and concluded that "After All These Years is about proclaiming the majesty of God and crying out in awe and wonder for His Presence, and it's a must-have for your praise and worship collection." Kelly Meade, indicating in a three-point-three star review at Today's Christian Entertainment, states the recording, "is the kind of worship album that keeps the current trend of melodic vocals and soaring instrumental backgrounds going while during the hearts and thoughts of listeners towards God and His mercy, love and grace."

Commercial performance 
After All These Years made its debut on Billboard Christian Albums chart at No. 1 with 16,000 equivalent album units sold as of February 8, 2017. The album also registered at No. 21 on the Billboard 200 and No. 32 on the Canadian Albums chart. The album also made the duo's debut on the Australian ARIA Albums Chart at No. 7.

Track listing

Personnel 
Adapted from AllMusic.

 Robby Busick – production manager
 Chris Estes – director
 Kiley Goodpasture – creative director
 Stephen James Hart – art direction, design
 Jason Ingram – background vocals, producer, programming
 Brian Johnson – acoustic guitar, background vocals, executive producer, vocals
 Jenn Johnson – background vocals, executive producer, vocals
 Dwayne Larring – electric guitar
 Brett Mabury – string arrangements
 Paul Mabury – background vocals, drums, producer, programming
 Stephen Marcussen – mastering
 Sean Moffit – mixing, mixing engineer
 Justin Posey – photography
 Joel Taylor – executive producer
 Joe Williams – programming

Charts

Weekly charts

Year-end charts

Release history

References 

2017 albums
Brian & Jenn Johnson albums